WHLJ (1400 AM) is a Christian radio station broadcasting a Contemporary Christian music format. Licensed to Moultrie, Georgia, United States, the station is currently owned by LaTaurus Productions, Inc. through its LaTaurus Productions Two, LLC licensee

References

External links

HLJ